The 1957 NCAA Track and Field Championships were contested June 14−15 at the 36th annual NCAA-sanctioned track meet to determine the individual and team national champions of men's collegiate track and field in the United States. This year's events were hosted by the University of Texas at Austin at Memorial Stadium in Austin.

Villanova captured the team national championship, the Wildcats' first title in program history.

Team Result
Note: Top 10 finishers only
(H) = Hosts

See also
 NCAA Men's Outdoor Track and Field Championship
 1956 NCAA Men's Cross Country Championships

References

NCAA Men's Outdoor Track and Field Championship
NCAA Track and Field Championships
NCAA
NCAA Track and Field Championships